Samura ibn Jundab al-Fazārī (his father Jundab's name is also commonly transliterated as Jundub; died 677–679) was a companion of the Islamic prophet Muhammad who fought at the Battle of Uhud in 627 and later participated in the Muslim conquest of Iran in the 630s–640s. In 670–673 he served as the lieutenant governor of Basra under Ziyad ibn Abihi, the supreme governor of Iraq and the eastern Umayyad Caliphate. During his deputy rule over Basra, he is held by the Islamic traditional sources to have ordered wide-scale executions of Kharijites in his jurisdiction. He remained governor of Basra under the Umayyad caliph Mu'awiya I for six to eighteen months after Ziyad's death in August/September 673 until the Caliph replaced him.

Origins and early life
Samura ibn Jundab belonged to the Banu Lay clan of the Shamkh branch of the Fazara, a nomadic Arab tribe, itself a division of the Ghatafan confederation, which dwelt in the part of the Hejaz (western Arabia) north of Medina. His father was the Fazari tribesman Jundab ibn Hilal ibn Harij ibn Murra ibn Hazn. Samura's widowed mother was remarried to Murayy ibn Sinan ibn Tha'laba, a member of the Ansar (supporters of the Islamic prophet Muhammad from Medina). Through his stepfather he became an affiliate of the Banu Khudra clan of the Khazraj, one of the two tribal divisions of the Ansar.

As a youth Samura became a companion of Muhammad. According to the history of al-Waqidi (d. 823), he fought in Muhammad's ranks at the Battle of Uhud in 627, after convincing Muhammad of his prowess when the Islamic prophet wanted to send him back to Medina due to his young age. He later participated in the Muslim conquest of Sasanian Iran (630s–640s), and was appointed the lieutenant governor of Suq al-Ahwaz in the region of Khuzistan by Abu Musa al-Ash'ari, the governor of Basra, one of the two main Arab garrison towns of Iraq.

Governorship of Basra
Samura was one of a number of Muhammad's companions in Basra chosen by the city's new governor, Ziyad ibn Abihi, to join his administration, following his appointment to the post by the Umayyad caliph Mu'awiya I in 665. When Ziyad's governorship was expanded to include Kufa, the other main Iraqi garrison town, and its dependencies, in 670, he appointed Samura as his deputy governor over Basra; Ziyad would govern from Basra six months and from Kufa for six months. The traditional Muslim sources attribute wide-scale executions of Kharijites and others suspected of holding Kharijite views in Basra to Samura. He may have led the funeral prayers for Sajah, the one time self-proclaimed prophetess who opposed Medina during the Ridda wars before submitting to Islam and settling in Basra. Samura remained in office at the time of Ziyad's death in August/September 673 and was kept in the post by Mu'awiya for six or eighteen months afterward. He was replaced by Abd Allah ibn Amr ibn Ghaylan.

Death and descendants
Samura died in AH 58 or 59 (677–679 CE). His death in Basra was attributed to a severe frost by the 9th-century historian Umar ibn Shabba. His kunya was Abu Sa'd or Abu Sulayman. Like his father, Samura's son Sa'd or Sa'id also transmitted hadith. His daughter Umm Thabit was wed to Mukhtar al-Thaqafi, who took over Kufa and ruled in the name of Caliph Ali's family during the Second Muslim Civil War (680–692). Samura's great-grandson Abu Ishaq Ibrahim ibn Habib ibn Sulayman (d. 777) was a prominent astronomer and the first Muslim to construct an astrolabe.

Hadith transmission
Samura was a prominent transmitter of hadith (traditions and sayings of Muhammad). He transmitted via Caliph Ali, a cousin and son-in-law of Muhammad, to the prominent Basran scholar al-Hasan al-Basri.

References

Bibliography

 

 

 

 

670s deaths
Ghatafan
People of the Muslim conquest of Persia
Sahabah hadith narrators
Umayyad governors of Basra